Grand Jeté is a design and production studio specializing in branding consultation, design, film, and motion graphics. The company was founded by Howard Nourmand and is located in the Hollywood Athletic Club in Hollywood, California. The studio has created content for brands and clients including HBO, Brett Ratner, Oliver Stone, Stussy, Capitol Records, CBS, Lena Dunham, RatPac Entertainment, TBS, Warner Bros, 20th Century Fox, among others. The company has been recognized by AIGA, Art of the Title, Print Magazine, Fast Company and Vice.

History 
Founded in 2003 by Howard Nourmand, Grand Jeté has created content for title sequences and film projects including Oliver Stone’s Wall street: Money Never Sleeps and Savages, Brett Ratner’s Tower Heist, the theatrical branding for RatPac Entertainment, and Scott Caan’s The Dog Problem.

In 2011, Grand Jeté created the logo and opening title design for HBO’s hit show Girls. Grand Jeté later went on to design the feminist newsletter Lenny Letter for the Girls creator Lena Dunham and her partner Jenni Konner, as well as their production company shingle.

References 

Film production companies of the United States
Companies based in Los Angeles
2003 establishments in California
American companies established in 2003